Angelika Noack (born 20 October 1952) is a German rower who competed for East Germany in the 1976 Summer Olympics and in the 1980 Summer Olympics.

She was born in Angermünde. In 1976 she and her partner Sabine Dähne won the silver medal in the coxless pairs event. Four years later she was a crew member of the East German boat which won the gold medal in the coxed pairs competition.

References

External links 
 
 
 

1952 births
Living people
East German female rowers
People from Angermünde
Olympic rowers of East Germany
Olympic gold medalists for East Germany
Olympic silver medalists for East Germany
Olympic medalists in rowing
Rowers at the 1976 Summer Olympics
Rowers at the 1980 Summer Olympics
Medalists at the 1976 Summer Olympics
Medalists at the 1980 Summer Olympics
World Rowing Championships medalists for East Germany
European Rowing Championships medalists
Sportspeople from Brandenburg